Trichoglottis biglandulosa is a species of flowering plant from the orchid family, Orchidaceae. It is endemic to the island of Java in Indonesia. It is part of the monopodial subtribe Aeridinae and bears nearly white flowers that are proportionally large compared to the rest of the plant.

Description
Trichoglottis biglandulosa is a very small epiphytic herb with a fibrous root system. Its leaves are arranged alternately and are thick, and linear-lanceolate. The inflorescence is unbranching, and the flowers are pedunculate and almost white. The sepals and petals are unfused, spreading, and minutely clawed, with the interior slightly more narrow. The labellum is small, with a slight compressed pouch towards the base. Behind the opening of pouch is a two-lobed callus. The lip is completely fused with the  column. The column is short, broad, blunt, and spreading-erect, with the anther distal. The pollinia are globose, connected by a thin elastic stalk, to which they are fixed by the center. The plant blooms from April to July.

Distribution and habitat
Trichoglottis biglandulosa is endemic to the island of Java. It grows at rather high elevations in montane forests. At the time of its publication, it was reported from Mount Gede and Mount Salak.

Taxonomy and naming
Trichoglottis biglandulosa was first described by Carl Ludwig Blume in 1825 as Ceratochilus biglandulosus. The taxon Gastrochilus biglandulosus was subsequently synonymized with T. biglandulosa in 1891 by Kuntze. In 2014, Kocyan and Schuiteman moved the former monotypic genus Ceratochilus into Trichoglottis. Though Ceratochilus was never considered to be closely related to Trichoglottis, molecular analysis strongly supported its position as sister to T. pusilla. Rather than excluding T. pusilla, the authors merged Ceratochilus with Trichoglottis.

References

 Pridgeon, A.M., Cribb, P.J., Chase, M.A. & Rasmussen, F. eds. (1999). Genera Orchidacearum 1. Oxford Univ. Press.
 Pridgeon, A.M., Cribb, P.J., Chase, M.A. & Rasmussen, F. eds. (2001). Genera Orchidacearum 2. Oxford Univ. Press.
 Pridgeon, A.M., Cribb, P.J., Chase, M.A. & Rasmussen, F. eds. (2003). Genera Orchidacearum 3. Oxford Univ. Press
 Berg Pana, H. 2005. Handbuch der Orchideen-Namen. Dictionary of Orchid Names. Dizionario dei nomi delle orchidee. Ulmer, Stuttgart

External links

Orchids of Java
biglandulosa